Bulli FC, commonly known as Bulli Football Club are a semi-professional association football team based in Bulli, New South Wales. They compete in the Illawarra Premier League, and are considered one of the most successful teams in the competition having finished Premiers 4 times, the most recently in 2014. The team plays out of Balls Paddock, a small ground located at Woonona, just south of Bulli which was opened in 1988. Bulli FC has had several well known, high-profile players both play, and coach at the club including Socceroos players Adrian Alston, and Dean Heffernan. In addition to their Illawarra Premier League team, Bulli FC also fields junior teams and women's teams in local club competitions in Wollongong.

History

Foundation
Bulli football club, was founded at the turn of the 20th century in 1901, however records of some organised football competition go back as far as the mid 1880s. This is believed to be the North Illawarra Rovers who are credited with being the "First club on the NSW South Coast – North Illawarra, with a ground at Bulli, founded in 1888". The foundations of the club were believed to have occurred whilst British traditions of football were still in a development stage.

Early years
Historically, Bulli have always played in strips of blue and white. This however changed in the 1950s when following amalgamation with Bulli Surf Life Saving Club (Bulli SLSC) they changed their kits to green and gold. In 1956 Bulli took out their first Premiership of the Illawarra 1st division. The 1960s were seen as the golden generation for the club, with silverware and success being had right throughout the decade. The 1969 team, coached by Ron Mcgarry (Ex Newcastle Unt UK and South coast Unt) won an impressive 5 trophies that year, including the Premiership & Championship for 1969, NSW Amateur Cup, Langridge Shield and the Corrimal Leagues Knock-out. These successes earned the team the title "The invincibles".

1970s, 1980s and 1990s
Th 1970s saw a return to a blue and white playing strip. However the 70s was not to be a successful decade for the club on the field. However, it was a success for the field of youth which the club brought through their ranks. The club however struggled in the opening years of the IPL.

The 1980s would be a mixed bag of success's and disappointments for the club. They were relegated into the second division in 1982, however re-gained promotion into the Illawarra Premier League after winning the 1983 second division. 2 years later they would achieve their first success in the Illawarra Premier League, when they won the 1985 season. 1986 would see them defend their Premiership, and go on to win further silverware, winner the grand final. 1988 would also see more success for the North Wollongong club, with the opening of their home ground Balls Paddock, by Wollongong Mayor Frank Arkell, MP Brian Tobin, and Illawarra Football Association President George Naylor. Bulli would go on to win their third IPL title in 1988, their last piece of silverware for 26 years.

The 1990s for the club saw steady finishing, for little or no reward. Some of the club's most famous, and well-respected players played during this era including Rod Paterson who would go on a 22-year career with the club.

2000s-now
The start of the 21st century started poorly for Bulli, with the club being relegated for only their second time in its history in 2002 since the foundation of the Illawarra Premier League. However, like their previous relegation in 1982, the club bounced back the season following, and would go on to win the Bampton Cup in 2004.

In 2006 Bulli made headlines in the Australian footballing community, when they signed former English born Socceroo, Adrian Alston. Alston, who made appearances for Cardiff City FC, and Luton Town FC coached the club for 2-years.

The club's next major piece of silverware would come in the 2014 Illawarra Premier League season, where they finished Premiers, ahead of Dapto Dandaloo Fury FC. Dapto Dandaloo would go on to win the grand final, defeating Bulli 2–0 in the process. It was this season they signed another former Socceroo, and former A-League stalwart Dean Heffernan who signed for the club following a stint with the Western Sydney Wanderers.

In 2017, Matt Bailey took over from Ben Smith as first-grade coach. The side enjoyed success in the FFA Cup, reaching the seventh round where they were beaten 3–0 by NPL heavyweights Blacktown City at Balls Paddock. Bulli won the Bert Bampton Cup for the second time in their history, their final opponents where Albion Park White Eagles and a Marcus Beattie goal saw Bulli win 1–0. In the final round of the season, Bulli clinched their fifth League Championship with a 1–0 win over 2nd placed Wollongong Olympic FC. Bulli made it to the Grand Final where they faced Port Kembla who came 5th in the regular season. Though Bulli were strong favourites Port Kembla secured a shock upset, winning via a penalty shootout after it finished 0–0 after extra time.

Grand Final Hoodoo
Despite being one of the Premier League's most successful clubs, Bulli would go 32-years between their first grand final win in 1986 and their second in 2018. This period saw the club lose eight grand finals including seven in 12 seasons between 2006 and 2017 including a shock penalty shootout defeat to Port Kembla in 2017 which was one of the biggest upsets in the competition's history. Bulli would break the hoodoo in 2018 with a 3–2 win over rivals Wollongong United at Win Stadium

Notable past players and managers
  Adrian Alston – 43 appearances, 7 goals for Australia
  Dean Heffernan – 2 appearances, 1 goal for Australia

Honours and awards
 Illawarra Premier League
Premiers (6): 1985, 1986, 1988, 2014, 2017, 2018
Champions (2): 1986, 2018

 Bert Bampton Cup
Champions (2): 2004, 2017

References

Soccer clubs in Wollongong
Illawarra Premier League
Association football clubs established in 1901
1901 establishments in Australia